Lake Werbellin (German Werbellinsee) is a lake in the Barnim district of Brandenburg, Germany. It is located south of Joachimsthal in the Schorfheide-Chorin Biosphere Reserve. The southern shore belongs to the Schorfheide municipality. With a surface area of  it is the fourth largest lake in Brandenburg and with  the second deepest (after Lake Stechlin).

Overview
Werbellinsee became famous for the Hubertusstock hunting lodge on its western shore, originally built in 1849, later the resort of East German leader Erich Honecker, where he received several official guests, among them West German Chancellor Helmut Schmidt in December 1981. The eastern shore near the village of Altenhof was the site of a large Young Pioneer camp (Pionierrepublik Wilhelm Pieck).

Today the lake is a popular destination for yachtsmen and the site of several sailing regattas. It is navigable and connected with the Oder river and the Baltic Sea. The northern shore offers winding roads with few traffic disruptions, making it a popular spot for motorcycle riding.

See also
Grimnitzsee

External links

Federal waterways in Germany
Werbellin
Werbellin
Barnim